Campion School is a private Catholic primary and secondary school for boys located at 13 Cooperage Road, Mumbai, in the state of Maharashtra, India. Established in 1943 by Jesuit Fr. Joseph Savall, the school is named in honour of Saint Edmund Campion, a 16th-century English Roman Catholic martyr.

The school is housed in Wellesley House on Cooperage Road in the Fort neighbourhood of South west Mumbai. The school is across the street from Cooperage Ground, which is a major soccer stadium in Mumbai, as well as Oval Maidan a city landmark. The school has over 800 students and offers classes at elementary and secondary levels, ranging from preparatory to grade 10. It is affiliated with the ICSE school syllabus and has English as its primary language of instruction.

Campion School has been taking part in most of the inter-school events organized by the Government, and often has prevailed. In a 2009 pan-India survey of day boys schools, conducted by Education World magazine, Campion School was ranked first in the country, and in 2013 it garnered the penultimate place.

History
Campion School was founded on 20 January 1943 by Father Joseph Savall, S.J. He had been the principal of St. Mary's High School, Mazgaon, for many years. In 1942, the Society of Jesus purchased Wellesely House on 13 Cooperage Road to house Campion School. But opposition from tenants delayed occupancy for 5 years, during which time the school was run from a ground floor rented at 45 New Marine Lines. It moved to Cooperage Road on 19 January. Within nine months the Department of Education recognised and registered Campion School under the Code of European Schools. It was authorised to teach up to Standard IV and to add one standard every year until the highest form was reached.

The school grew steadily in the late 1940s, but lacked a full-time principal, and Fr. Savall retired and returned to Europe in June 1949. Fr. Conesa, the director of the Technical Institute at St. Xavier's College, Mumbai, served as principal until December 1950. Jesuit authorities appointed Fr. E.F. More first full-time principal. More oversaw major renovations to Wellesely House including the acquisition of the second floor in 1954 and the addition of a fourth floor.

In 1956, Campion School attained the stature of a full-fledged high school with an enrollment of 382. It was recognised by the University of Cambridge as an A-certificate school and by the S.S.C. Board, Pune. In the same year, the first batch of students appeared for the Senior Cambridge Overseas Examination and all eight of them passed, five secured Grade I, one secured Grade II, and two secured Grade III. According to a rating in the Hindustan Times, the school's highest ratings are in "attitude towards learning, sports, social engagement, governance."

Academics
The school year consists of two terms from May to April, with October as mid-year. The course of school studies extends from the Preparatory Class to Class 10. It is designed to prepare students for the ICSE Examination, conducted by the Council for the Indian School Certificate Examinations.

In addition to English which is the primary language of instruction, Hindi is taught from Class 1 and Marathi, the regional language of the state of Maharashtra, is compulsory from Class 1 to Class 8.

In 2016, Campion emerged first in both the junior (78 teams) and senior (82 teams) divisions of the 16th Hindu Young World Quiz. Also, a student from Campion won the gold medal in a mental abacus contest sponsored by UMCAS.

School badge
The school badge is in the form of a medieval shield. The shield has three major divisions, each with a different colour background, and a scroll containing the school motto "Joy in Truth". This motto is symbolically expressed by each of the three main divisions on the shield.

On the left side, against a red background is a rope shaped like a noose. It stands for the death of St. Edmund Campion, professedly for the love of Truth. On the right side, against a white background are three birds that stand for Joy while the star stands for Truth. Finally, at the base of the shield is to be found the logo of the Jesuits. It consists of the first three letters of Jesus' name in Greek. Contrary to the popular belief, the divisions and their background colours do not represent the colour of the four school "houses".

Principals
The following individuals have served as principals of the school:

School organisations 
All students are assigned to a house. There were three houses until the 1990s when Berchmans was added:
 Britto House (red), motto "Unity is strength" - named after St. John de Brito
 Loyola House (white), motto "Now or Never" - named after St. Ignatius of Loyola
 Xavier House (blue), motto "Never Give in" - named after St. Francis Xavier
 Berchmans House (yellow), motto "Service before self" - named after St. John Berchmans

Since 2016, the junior school (standards 1 to 5) has different names and colors for the houses. The names are Gandhi, Raman, Nehru and Tagore and the respective colors are orange, purple, green, and white.

The School Council is a body established to put into practice the aims and objectives of the house system. The Council is made up of the School Captain and his Assistant, the House Prefects and their Assistants, the Leaders, the Class Monitor of the upper classes, and representatives of activities and organisations. It serves as an advisory body to the administration.

School organisations include:
 43rd East Bombay Cub Packs: selection of recruits for five Cub Packs is made from the Primary section.
 43rd East Bombay Scout Troop: the selection of recruits for the Scout Troop is made in the Secondary section. As a rule, students who have been cubs are given preference. The Scout motto is "Be prepared".
 The 19th Mah. Junior NCC Air Wing and the 21st Troop Junior NCC Naval Unit 1st Mah. Bn. Wing: the NCC provides training for students with a view to developing in them officer-like qualities, thus enabling them to obtain commissions in the Armed Forces.
 The Road Safety Patrol (RSP), motto "We live to serve", provides service training to young men and women so as to stimulate interest in the safety from accidents for the people and to build up officers to enable the Police Force to expand in a time of emergency.
 The Junior Red Cross trains its members to care for their own health and that of others, and to help the sick and suffering, especially children.
 The Interact Club is a Junior branch of the Rotary movement and aims at fostering a sense of social concern and international understanding among young students. It undertakes relief projects on behalf of the underprivileged.
 Sanskar provides an opportunity to the students to follow and understand the cultural values of the ancient Indian Civilisation.
 The Nature Club of India represents the Youth Wing of the World Wildlife Fund. Its aim is to make India's children aware of the economic, cultural, and aesthetic value of national resources by spreading interest and knowledge about its wildlife, rivers, forests, and other natural resources.
 Elocution, Debating, and Dramatics: trains higher-class students in public speaking and drama. Prizes are awarded to the best individual speakers both in English and in Hindi and to the best Class and House in Inter-Class, Inter-House Elocution, Dramatic, and General Knowledge competitions.
 The Campion Review issued twice yearly fosters the literary talent of students. It is managed by an Editorial Board and includes news reports.
 The School Band, instituted by Fr. E.F. More, S.J, was revived in 1996. It plays at school functions such as the Republic Day parade, Independence Day, and the Annual Athletics Meet.
 The Audio-Visual Instruction Room screens educational films, documentaries, and video cassettes.
 Games and Sports: the school has a gymnasium where all boys of the Senior School have a programme of physical education. The wide range of co-curricular activities includes soccer, cricket, athletics, gymnastics, swimming, basketball, music, drama, debates and elocution, along with badminton, table-tennis, and lawn tennis. There are annual meets for athletics, aquatics, and a Junior Sports Festival. In 2015 Campion won the Under-16 Mumbai School Sports Association (MSSA) Division 1 title.  Education Today magazine ranked Campion number one in sports education in 2016.

Notable alumni 

Business and industry
 Kumar Mangalam Birla - Chairman, Aditya Birla Group
 Niranjan Hiranandani - Managing Director, Hiranandani Group
 Mohit Jain - Managing Director, Indo Count Industries Ltd
 Pramit Jhaveri - CEO, Citi India
 Farrokh K. Kavarana - Director, Tata Sons & Tata Industries Ltd
 Alok Kejriwal - founder & CEO, Contests2Win.com
 Juzar Khorakiwala - Chairman & Managing Director, Biostadt India Ltd
 Mahesh Madhavan - CEO, Bacardi
 Keki Mistry - Vice Chairman & CEO, Housing Development Finance Corporation
 Vikram Parikh - Managing Principal, Global Catalyst Partners
 Bhaskar Pramanik - Chairman, Microsoft India
 Neville Taraporewala - Country Head, Yahoo! India
Ratan Tata - Former chairman of Tata Sons and Tata Group

Politics
 Praful Patel - former Minister for Heavy Industries and Public Enterprises, Government of India
 Jyotiraditya Scindia - politician and former Maharaja of Gwalior
 Shashi Tharoor - former diplomat, Former Minister of State (Ministry of HRD and External Affairs) in the Union Government and Member of Parliament

Film and fashion

 Ranjit Chowdhry - Bollywood and Hollywood actor, screenwriter
 Sanjay Gadhvi - Bollywood director
 Jugal Hansraj - Bollywood actor
 Randhir Kapoor - Bollywood actor, producer & director
 Rajiv Kapoor - Bollywood actor
 Rishi Kapoor - Bollywood actor
 Atul Kasbekar - photographer
 Tarun Tahiliani - fashion designer
 Vivek Vaswani - Bollywood actor, producer

Literature, theatre and journalism

 Maxim Mazumdar - dramatist and playwright, founder of the now-folded Phoenix Theatre in Montreal, Quebec, Canada
 Dom Moraes - Goan writer and poet
 Jehangir Pocha - (late) journalist, Editor-in-Chief at NewsX Television
 Rajdeep Sardesai - journalist and recipient of the Padma Shri in 2007 for contributions to Indian journalism

Science
 Dr. Mustansir Barma - theoretical physicist, recipient of the Shanti Swarup Bhatnagar (1995) and Padma Shri (2013) awards and director of TIFR from 2007-2014
 Dr Adi Bulsara - physicist prominent in field of nonlinear dynamics
 Dr. Shiraz Minwalla - theoretical physicist and string theorist, recipient of the Shanti Swarup Bhatnagar (2011) and TWAS Prize (2016) award from The World Academy of Sciences
 Dr. Vikram Patel - leading psychiatrist and recipient of Rhodes Scholarship and MacArthur Foundation Fellow for Leadership Development

Sport
 Adrian Ezra - squash player - 7 times Indian national squash champion
 Hirji Nagarwalla - Indian athlete (represented India at the 1986 Asian Games held in Seoul)

Military and police
 Air Marshal Adi Gandhi - youngest pilot to be awarded the Vir Chakra
 ADGP Himanshu Roy, Indian Police Service
 ADGP Rajnish Seth, Indian Police Service
 Rear Admiral Mahendra Pratap Taneja - Flag Officer, Maharashtra Naval Area

In popular culture
The school is mentioned in Salman Rushdie's book The Moor's Last Sigh as a school for boys from "good homes".

Other schools mentioned in a similar context are Cathedral and John Connon School and Walsingham House School.

See also

 List of Jesuit schools
 List of schools in Mumbai
 Violence against Christians in India

References

External links
 Official website
 Alumni website
 Campion sites

1943 establishments in India
Boys' schools in India
Educational institutions established in 1943
Private schools in Mumbai
Jesuit primary schools in India
Jesuit secondary schools in India
High schools and secondary schools in Mumbai
Christian schools in Maharashtra